Wolfhound (22 April 1989 – 2009) was a Thoroughbred racehorse and sire. He won the Haydock Sprint Cup and the Prix de la Forêt.

Background
Wolfhound was a chestnut horse bred in Kentucky by William S. Farish III and William S. Kilroy. He was acquired by Sheikh Mohammed and was sent to race in Europe where he was trained by John Gosden.

Racing career
Wolfhound raced for three years and won six of his sixteen races. As a three-year-old in 1992, he won the Diadem Stakes at Ascot and the Prix de la Forêt at Longchamp. In the following year he added another major victory when he took the Haydock Sprint Cup.

Stud record
Wolfhound stood as a breeding stallion in Europe and South Africa but made little impact as a sire of winners. By far the best of his offspring was the filly Bright Sky.

References

1989 racehorse births
2009 racehorse deaths
Racehorses trained in the United Kingdom
Racehorses bred in Kentucky
Thoroughbred family 3-l